Events from the year 1269 in Ireland.

Incumbent
Lord: Henry III

Events
 Jordan Óge de Exeter became Sheriff of Connacht

Deaths
 Aed Ó Finn, Irish musician
 Donnchadh Cime Mág Samhradháin, chief of the McGovern Clan from 1258 until his murder in 1269
 Íomhaor mac Tighearnán Mág Tighearnán, chief of the McKiernan Clan from 1258 until his death in 1269

References

 
1260s in Ireland
Ireland
Years of the 13th century in Ireland